The 2007–08 season was the 83rd season in the history of Fussball-Club Luzern and the club's second consecutive season in the top flight of Swiss football.

Players

First-team squad

Transfers

Competitions

Overall record

Swiss Super League

League table

Results summary

Results by round

Matches

Swiss Cup

References

FC Luzern seasons
Luzern